The Livermore Valley, historically known as the Valle de San José (Valley of San José), is a valley in Alameda County, California, located in the East Bay region. The city of Livermore is located in the valley.

Geography 
The valley is bounded by the Diablo Range on the north, east, and south; and is linked to the west with the Amador Valley.

Watercourses draining the Livermore Valley include Arroyo Mocho, Arroyo Valle, Arroyo Seco, and Arroyo Las Positas.

Wine Country 
The southern side of Livermore is wine country. Wineries in the area include Wente Vineyards and Concannon Vineyards.

Laboratories 
In the east of Livermore is the Lawrence Livermore Laboratory. Element 116 on the periodic table, Livermorium, is named after this laboratory. Sandia Laboratory is also located in eastern Livermore.

Due to these laboratories, much of eastern Livermore is off-limits to the general public.

History
Livermore Valley was named after Robert Livermore, an immigrant American rancher in Mexican Alta California, who with his business partner José Noriega were keeping livestock in the valley since 1834. Livermore and Jose Noriega received the Mexican land grant for Rancho Las Positas, which encompassed the valley, in 1839 from Governor Juan Bautista Alvarado.

In 1847 Noriega and Livermore purchased Rancho Canada de los Vaqueros adjacent to the north of Rancho Las Positas and Livermore Valley in the Diablo Range.

Livermore's name became well known during the California Gold Rush in the late 1840s−early 1850s, for an inn at his adobe ranch house in the valley that served miners and other travelers eastbound on the road from the Bay Area through the Diablo Range's passes to the Mother Lode region in the Sierra Nevada.

The valley came to be called by his name, as was Livermore Pass then (present day Altamont Pass), the valley's northern pass that led to Stockton and the gold fields.

See also
 Livermore Valley AVA

References

 
Valleys of Alameda County, California
Subregions of the San Francisco Bay Area
Valleys of California